Bury Football Club was founded in 1884 and joined the Football League in 1894. In its early years, team management was the responsibility of one or more members of the club committee and the first specialist manager was appointed in 1907. The table below provides a list of all the club's managers to date.

The Bury F.C. website contains a list, drawn from the club's own records, of first team managers from 1890 until David Flitcroft's appointment on 9 December 2013. The page has not been updated since then so all later dates are individually sourced.

References

External links 
 

 
Managers
Bury F.C.